Gruffudd Fychan I, Prince of Powys Fadog from 1277 to 1284, was the youngest of the four sons of Prince Gruffudd ap Madog, Lord of Dinas Bran.

On his father's death in 1269 (or 1270) his share was the Lordship of Iâl (Yale) and Edeirnion, which included Glyn Dyfrdwy.

He was aligned to Llywelyn ap Gruffudd, Prince of Wales, in the war of 1277.  In the peace treaty, it was agreed that he would not do homage to Llywelyn for Edeirnion, but to Edward I of England for Iâl.  He again fought alongside Llywelyn during the war of 1282–1283, and lost his lands with his defeat.

Nevertheless, the Earl of Surrey persuaded the king to allow him possession of his lands, which he held from the king as a tenant at will for the rest of his life.  He died in 1289 leaving a young son, Madog Crypl.

Lord Tudur ap Gruffudd and Owain Glyndŵr, the last native Prince of Wales, were his great-grandsons, the grandson of Madog Crypl.

References
 J. E. Lloyd, Owen Glendower: Owen Glyn Dŵr (Clarendon Press, Oxford, 1931), 9-11.

1289 deaths
Monarchs of Powys
13th-century Welsh monarchs
Year of birth unknown